The Great De Gaulle Stone Operation is the first short in the Inspector series of theatrical cartoons. A total of 34 entries were produced between 1965 and 1969.

Plot
The Inspector has been tasked by the Commissioner to guard the De Gaulle Stone, an enormous diamond worth 10 billion francs. The Commissioner warns the Inspector of the dire consequences should he lose the diamond, but the Inspector manages to lose it in seconds, handing it to what he thinks is his assistant, Sgt. Deux Deux, but is in fact a three-headed thief, collectively referred to as the Brothers Matzoriley. The left (the Soviet Russian-accented "Weft") and right (the American-accented "Wight") heads argue about what to do next, and the apparently dim third head (the Chinese "Wong") tries to break up the fight, only to be clobbered by his brothers. The Inspector uses this chance to try to catch up with them, at which point they get into their car and drive away, accidentally flattening the Inspector in the process. Deux-Deux tries to pursue them himself, but he flattens the Inspector some more instead.

The Brothers Matzoriley are heading home when they see the Inspector chasing them. They shoot bullets at him, breaking his car and stripping him until he's only wearing his Pink Panther underwear. They also drop a bomb on him from up in the air.

The Brothers Matzoriley have their car convert itself into a plane, forcing the Inspector to man a plane of his own in order to pursue them. The crooks easily dispose of him with a giant fly-swatter however, and his plane crashes into the Sûreté building, destroying the Commissioner's office and earning the Inspector another ear-bashing. The trio manages to escape, but once back at their mansion, Wong discovers that their coat pocket has a hole in it, and they have managed to lose the diamond.

The Inspector returns the diamond to the Commissioner, and puts it in a safe. Unfortunately, the safe turns out to be the evil three in disguise. The Inspector and Deux-Deux pursue the thieves to a hotel, where the Inspector's attempts at catching them meet with a predictable lack of success. The Inspector is shot in the eye by, but when he shows Deux-Deux what is coming through the keyhole, Deux-Deux begins whooping excitedly at what he sees (presumably Can-Can dancers). The Inspector takes a second look and is shot again. When the Inspector announces he will shoot at the count of three, the Brothers Matzoriley escape in their car, knocking down the door and flattening the Inspector, who fires a bullet that only drops to the ground.

The three are finally surrounded in their hideout by the Inspector and a number of backup units. Realizing that they are finished, Wong places the diamond in a glass of water, within which it is inconspicuous. The Inspector and the other officers break in, and apprehend the thieves. While the others search for the missing diamond, the Inspector decides to help himself to the nearby glass of water, and swallows the diamond in the process. He is then rushed to the hospital where the De Gaulle diamond is surgically removed and given to the assisting nurse, which is actually the Brothers Matzoriley in disguise. The Inspector touches the area of the cut in his surgery, where the diamond was removed, and winces in pain, when he describes how he feels about the diamond escapade.

Production notes
The Great De Gaulle Stone Operation was released with the James Bond film Thunderball during its original theatrical run. The title is a parody of the medical condition gallstones as well as a reference to then-French President, Charles de Gaulle.

The Brothers Matzoriley first appeared in the credits of A Shot in the Dark and were seen again in The Super 6, another cartoon series produced in 1966 by Depatie-Freleng. They were referred to in the series as "The Brothers Matzoriley."

The Pink Panther Show contained a laugh track when the Pink Panther cartoons were broadcast on NBC-TV. Currently, the laugh-tracked version airs on the Spanish language Boomerang TV channel.

See also
 List of The Pink Panther cartoons

References

External links
 
 
 ''The Great De Gaulle Stone Operation at the DePatie-Freleng website

1965 films
1965 animated films
1960s American animated films
1960s animated short films
1965 comedy films
The Inspector
Short films directed by Friz Freleng
Films directed by Gerry Chiniquy
Films scored by William Lava
DePatie–Freleng Enterprises short films
American animated short films
1960s English-language films